Antoine Mountain is a downhill ski area located just outside of Mattawa in Northeastern Ontario, Canada. It currently hold the record for the longest ski run in Ontario with 2.9 kilometers long.

The public facilities include a main chalet (which includes seating, storage, washrooms, and a cafeteria), a rental building, and the Canadian Ski Patrol quarters.

The hill opened in 1975 as Mount Antoine and was run jointly with the Laurentian Ski Hill until 2000, which when it was closed.

In 2015, the hill reopened with a renovated facility and a new Doppelmayr quad lift.

See also
List of ski areas and resorts in Canada

References

External links

Geography of Nipissing District
Mattawa, Ontario
Ski areas and resorts in Ontario